Sanda Dewi was one of the three principal queens of King Bayinnaung of Burma from 1553 to 1581. She was also a queen of the last two kings of Prome Kingdom from 1532 to 1542. She was the maternal grandmother of Natshinnaung, king of Toungoo.

Brief
The queen was born Thiri Hpone Htut to King Shwenankyawshin of Ava and Queen Dhamma Dewi in 1517/1518. After her father was killed in action against the forces of the Confederation of Shan States and the Prome Kingdom on 25 March 1527, the young princess was brought to Prome (Pyay) by King Thado Minsaw of Prome. Later at Prome, she was married to one of Thado Minsaw's grandsons, King Narapati who ruled from 1532 to 1539. After Narapati died, she was married to his younger brother Minkhaung. She had a son with Minkhaung.

When Prome fell to Toungoo forces in May 1542, the king and queen of Prome were sent to Toungoo. But c. April 1553, Minkhaung was executed for suspicion of plotting against Bayinnaung. Thiri Hpone Htut then became Bayinnaung's queen, with the title of Sanda Dewi. They had a daughter, Khin Saw, who was mother of Natshinnaung, the future rebel king of Toungoo.

Ancestry

Notes

References

Bibliography
 
 
 
 

Queens consort of Toungoo dynasty
Chief queens consort of Toungoo dynasty
16th-century Burmese women